Robert Pinsky (born October 20, 1940) is an American poet, essayist, literary critic, and translator. From 1997 to 2000, he served as Poet Laureate Consultant in Poetry to the Library of Congress. Pinsky is the author of nineteen books, most of which are collections of his poetry. His published work also includes critically acclaimed translations, Dante Alighieri's Inferno and The Separate Notebooks by Czesław Miłosz. He teaches at Boston University.

Biography

Early life and education 
Pinsky was born in Long Branch, New Jersey to Jewish parents, Sylvia (née Eisenberg) and Milford Simon Pinsky, an optician. He attended Long Branch High School. He received a B.A. from Rutgers University in New Brunswick, New Jersey, and earned both an M.A. and PhD from Stanford University, where he was a Stegner Fellow in creative writing. He was a student of Francis Fergusson and Paul Fussell at Rutgers and Yvor Winters at Stanford.

Personal life 
Pinsky married Ellen Jane Bailey, a clinical psychologist, in 1961. They have three children. Pinsky taught at Wellesley College and at the University of California at Berkeley, and now lives in Cambridge, Massachusetts and teaches in the graduate writing program at Boston University.

Career 
Early on, Pinsky was inspired by the flow and tension of jazz and the excitement that it made him feel. As a former saxophonist, he has said that being a musician was a profoundly influential experience that he has tried to reproduce in his poetry. The musicality of poetry was and is extremely important to his work. Additionally, Pinsky revealed in a 1999 interview with Bomb Magazine that he enjoys jazz for its "physical immediacy, improvisation and also the sense that a lifetime of suffering and study and thought and emotion is behind some single phrase."

Pinsky has acknowledged that his poetry would change somewhat depending on the particular subjectivity of each reader. Embracing the idea that people's individuality would fill out the poem, he has said, "The poetry I love is vocal, composed with the poet's voice and I believe its proper culmination is to be read with a reader's imagined or actual voice. The human voice in that sense is not electronically reproduced or amplified; it's the actual living breath inside a body—not necessarily an expert's body or the artist's body. Whoever reads the poem aloud becomes the proper medium for the poem." Pinsky observes 'the kind of poetry I write emphasizes the physical qualities of the words' for poetry to Pinsky, is a vocal art, not necessarily performative, but reading to one self or recalling some lines by memory. Pinsky comments 'all language is necessarily abstract' . No aspect of a poem, he observes, is more singular, more unique, than its rhythm, for there are no rules.

He received a National Endowment for the Humanities Fellowship in 1974, and in 1997 he was named the United States Poet Laureate and Consultant in Poetry to the Library of Congress; he was the first poet to be named to three terms. As Poet Laureate, Pinsky founded the Favorite Poem Project, in which thousands of Americans of varying backgrounds, all ages, and from every state share their favorite poems. Pinsky believed that, contrary to stereotype, poetry has a strong presence in the American culture. The project sought to document that presence, giving voice to the American audience for poetry.

The Shakespeare Theatre of Washington, D.C. commissioned Pinsky to write a free adaptation of Friederich Schiller's drama Wallenstein. The Shakespeare Theatre presented the play, starring Stephen Pickering in the title role, directed by Michael Kahn, in 2013. Premiering on April 17 of that year, the play had a sold-out run, in repertory with Coriolanus. Pinsky also wrote the libretto for Death and the Powers, an opera by composer Tod Machover. The opera received its world premiere in Monte Carlo in September 2010 and its U.S. premiere at Boston's Cutler Majestic Theater in March 2011. Pinsky is also the author of the interactive fiction game Mindwheel (1984) developed by Synapse Software and released by Broderbund.

Pinsky guest-starred in an episode of the animated sitcom The Simpsons TV show, "Little Girl in the Big Ten" (2002), and appeared on The Colbert Report in April, 2007, as the judge of a "Meta-Free-Phor-All" between Stephen Colbert and Sean Penn.

In 2011, Farrar, Straus and Giroux published Selected Poems.

In 2012, Circumstantial Productions released the CD, PoemJazz, by Robert Pinsky and Laurence Hobgood.

Bibliography

Honors and awards 
 Premio Capri (Italian) in 2009
 Manhae Foundation Prize (Korean) in 2006
 PEN/Voelcker Award for Poetry in 2004
 Poet Laureate Consultant in Poetry to the Library of Congress (1997–2000)
 National Endowment for the Humanities Fellowship (1974)
 Stegner Fellowship in Creative Writing at Stanford University
 Saxifrage Prize (1980) for An Explanation of America
 William Carlos Williams Award of the Poetry Society of America
 Nominated for the National Book Critics Circle Award for Criticism (1988) for Poetry and the World
 Nominated for the Pulitzer Prize for Poetry (1996) for The Figured Wheel: New and Collected Poems, 1966–1996
 Ambassador Book Award in Poetry of the English Speaking Union
 Lenore Marshall Poetry Prize (1997) for The Figured Wheel: New and Collected Poems 1966–1996
 Los Angeles Times Book Award (1994) for The Inferno of Dante
 Book-of-the-Month Editor's Choice (1994) for The Inferno of Dante
 Academy of American Poets' Translation Award (1994) for The Inferno of Dante

Pinsky has received honorary doctorates from numerous institutions such as Northwestern University (2000), Binghamton University (2001), the University of Michigan (2001), Lake Forest College (2007), Emerson College (2012), Southern New Hampshire University (2014) University of Massachusetts Dartmouth (2016), and Merrimack College (2016)

References

Books and printed materials 
 The Art of Poetry LXXVI: Robert Pinsky" The Paris Review No. 144 (1997), pp. 180–213 (interview)
 Poetry in Review: "Robert Pinsky" The Yale Review Volume 105 No. 4 (2017), pp. 177–185

Online resources 
 Library of Congress Online Resources
 "Modernism and Memory," Pinsky's lecture from the 2010 Key West Literary Seminar
 "In a deepening room," ArchitectureBoston Magazine, Summer 2014: Books (Volume 18 n2)

External links 

 Official Robert Pinsky Website
 The Favorite Poem Project (with videos)
 The Art of Poetry MOOC Videos

Interviews 
 The Favorite Poem Project site
 Concord Academy 2012 Commencement Address
 LA Times story on PEN Center Lifetime Achievement award
 Audio, Bruce Springsteen reads "Samurai Song"at Wamfest 
 The PBS NewsHour 5/20/11 Interview
 Newark Star-Ledger Springsteen/Pinsky story
 Video, Colbert Report, Pinsky with Sean Penn and Colbert
 David Kaufman Review in Tablet
 Poet Robert Pinsky Takes on King David in a public radio interview on ThoughtCast!
 Robert Pinsky's interview about his time and inspirations in Maine
 Cortland Review Interview with Robert Pinsky

Poetry readings 
 
 Robert Pinsky reads his poem "Street Music".
 Interview with Robert Pinsky for Guernica Magazine
 Watch Robert Pinsky read "Book" at Open-Door Poetry 
 IPA: Robert Pinsky reads a selection of his poetry
 Pinsky poetry readings

Other 
 Essential Pleasures: Robert Pinsky's column on Poems Out Loud  (April 2009)
 Boston University Press Release
 Modern American Poetry on Robert Pinsky
 The Academy of American Poets on Robert Pinsky 

American male essayists
American male poets
American Poets Laureate
Jewish American poets
Italian–English translators
Polish–English translators
Slate (magazine) people
The New Yorker people
Boston University faculty
Duke University faculty
Wellesley College faculty
Rutgers University alumni
Stanford University alumni
Long Branch High School alumni
People from Long Branch, New Jersey
1940 births
Living people
Stegner Fellows
American male non-fiction writers
Translators of Dante Alighieri
Members of the American Academy of Arts and Letters